Robert Paige (born November 27, 1936) is a multi-disciplinary artist and arts educator working across textile design, painting, collage, and sculpture based in Woodlawn, Chicago. As an artist and textile designer allied with the Black Arts Movement, Robert E. Paige trained at the School of the Art Institute of Chicago and worked at the architecture firm Skidmore, Owings & Merrill, Sears Roebuck & Company and Fiorio Milano design house in Italy. Paige was raised in Chicago's South Side where he continues to live and work, further developing his longstanding career in the decorative arts. His work visually and conceptually interrogates political and cultural themes that reflect both historical and contemporary African American art references, as well as traditional textile practices of West Africa.

Career 
For much of his career Paige considered himself a "ghost artist", as much of his work went into circulation without the attachment of his name as a designer, although his "Kool-Aid Color" textile designs helped popularize West African patterns to American shoppers. Paige first worked as an interior designer at the architecture firm Skidmore, Owings & Merrill before studying textile design at the School of the Art Institute of Chicago under quilt maker Grace Earl. While at SAIC, he became inspired by the abstract and symbolic nature of African art at the Art Institute of Chicago, and began collecting photographs and slides of African sculpture at the museum, which would later inspire much of his professional work. After receiving his BFA in 1964, Paige found himself at the center of Chicago's Black Arts Movement, helping to create a new Black design aesthetic that links to many spheres of art and cultural production today. Paige was also a participating member of AfriCOBRA, a coalition of Black artists in Chicago that was deeply embedded in Black Chicago culture—representing the community they lived in as well as cultivating a larger Black aesthetic that was absent from the mainstream art scene and imagination. In a 2022 interview with Architectural Digest, he said of the time "Chicago was abuzz with creativity, camaraderie, and collaboration. We were on fire.” AfriCOBRA defined their mission as “an approach to image making which would reflect and project the moods, attitudes, and sensibilities of African Americans independent of the technical and aesthetic structures of Euro-centric modalities.”

In 1973 Paige was invited to the West Coast of Africa by Sears Roebuck & Company, as they were in need of reaching the African American consumer. Thus, The Dakkabar Collection was born and was eventually circulated in 126 Sears, Roebuck stores in 56 cities throughout the United States, inspired by his time in Dakar, Senegal. While in Africa, Paige toured textile manufacturing facilities that included the silk-screening process and their studios. This collection of fabrics and home furnishings was sold in 56 cities and 130 stores around the country. According to an interview in 1973 with the New York Times, the purpose of the collection, as stated by Paige, was to involve black culture in home furnishings designs “so the black homemaker can find something that speaks directly to her." Soon After, Paige would venture to Milan, Italy to sell pattern designs for manufacturing scarves and dress fabrics for the house of Fiorio Milano, which helped expand his work to a global audience. Upon returning to the United States he consistently participated in exhibitions, lectures and workshops from the elementary school level to college and universities. Paige was also a resident artist in the Cabrini Green neighborhood, and was very involved with the Chicago non-profit Gallery 37. He is now an artist in residence at the Dusable Museum, and has expanded his creative practice beyond textiles and is experimenting in painting, drawing, and ceramics. His work has since been exhibited in major art institutions and museums including the Art Institute of Chicago, Salon 94 Design Gallery in New York, The Hyde Park Art Center, and  Kavi Gupta Gallery in Chicago.

Awards and exhibition history

Exhibition history 
Lemme Know When You Make It, Group Exhibition, Hyde Park Art Center, June 20, 2022 - September 30, 2022

Power to the People, Solo Exhibition curated by Duro Oluwu, Salon 94 Design, New York City, New York, September 2022- November 2022

AfriCOBRA 50, Group Show, Kavi Gupta, Chicago, IL, September 29, 2018 - November 3, 2018

Solo Exhibition, The Parish Gallery, Georgetown, Washington DC, 2009

Solo Exhibition, Cin4ue Gallery, New York City, New York, 1995

"Black Print Matters", Group Show, South Side Community Center, Chicago, IL, 1992

Fabrications & Design "The Art of the Muppets" , Chicago Museum of Science and Industry, Chicago, IL, 1980

Solo Exhibition, Oakland Art Museum, Oakland, California, 1976

Solo Exhibition, St. Louis Art Museum, St. Louis, Missouri 1976

Frederick Douglas Museum of African American Art, Washington DC, 1976

"The Black Solidarity", Pittsburgh Civic Arena, Pittsburgh, Pennsylvania, 1976

Group Exhibition, Howard University, Washington, DC, 1975

Group Exhibition, Illinois Institute of Technology, Chicago, Illinois, 1964

Group Exhibition, Art Institute of Chicago, Chicago, Illinois, 1955

Group Exhibition, Young American US Museum of Contemporary Crafts, New York City, New York, 1952

Grants and awards 
Chicago Council on Fine Arts Grant, 1984

National Endowment for the Arts Exhibitions Grant, 1975-1976

References 

1936 births
Living people
American multimedia artists
African-American artists